A.N.T. Farm is a Disney Channel original series that follows Chyna Parks (China Anne McClain) and her two best friends, Olive Doyle (Sierra McCormick) and Fletcher Quimby (Jake Short), who are in the "Advanced Natural Talents" (A.N.T.) program for gifted middle schoolers at Webster High School in San Francisco. Disney renewed A.N.T. Farm for its second season November 30, 2011. Filming for season two began in early February 2012. On October 2, 2012, Disney Channel officially renewed A.N.T. Farm for a third season.

Series overview

Episodes

Season 1 (2011–12)

Season 2 (2012–13)

Season 3 (2013–14)
On October 2, 2012, Disney Channel officially renewed A.N.T. Farm for a third season. This season premiered on May 31, 2013. 
 Angus Chestnut (Aedin Mincks) joins the main cast. 
 Cameron Parks (Carlon Jeffery) is no longer part of the main cast. Webster High School marks its final showing in the one-hour season premiere "trANTsferred". Z-Tech Prodigy School took over as the season's new setting. This was the final season of the show, as confirmed by star China Anne McClain on her Twitter account on December 27, 2013.

References

General references

Lists of American children's television series episodes
Lists of Disney Channel television series episodes